This timeline is a chronology of significant events in the history of the U.S. State of Idaho and the historical area now occupied by the state.


2020s

2010s

2000s

1990s

1980s

1970s

1960s

1950s

1940s

1930s

1920s

1910s

1900s

1890s

1880s

1870s

1860s

1850s

1840s

1830s

1820s

1810s

1800s

1790s

1780s

1770s

1690s

1590s

1510s

1490s

Before 1492

See also

History of Idaho
Bibliography of Idaho history
Bibliography of Yellowstone National Park
Territorial evolution of Idaho
Territory of Idaho
State of Idaho
Index of Idaho-related articles
List of cities in Idaho
List of counties in Idaho
List of ghost towns in Idaho
List of governors of Idaho
List of places in Idaho
Outline of Idaho

References
References are included in the linked articles.

External links

State of Idaho website
Idaho State Historical Society website

Timeline of Idaho history
Timeline of Idaho history
Timelines of states of the United States